The Piano Artistry of Jonathan Edwards is a 1957 album of songs by Paul Weston and Jo Stafford in the guise of Jonathan and Darlene Edwards, a New Jersey lounge act who deliberately play the piano and sing off-key, putting their own interpretation on popular songs. Most of the tracks feature Weston's piano playing, although on four he is accompanied by Darlene. The album was released by Columbia Records (Catalog No: CL 1024) in 1957. It was re-released in 1985 by Corinthian Records.

Track listing

Side one

 It Might As Well Be Spring
 Poor Butterfly
 Autumn in New York (v. Darlene Edwards)
 Nola
 Stardust
 It's Magic (v. Darlene Edwards)

Side two
 Sunday, Monday or Always
 Jealousy
 Cocktails for Two (v. Darlene Edwards)
 Dizzy Fingers
 Three Coins in the Fountain
 You're Blasé (v. Darlene Edwards)

References

1957 albums
Columbia Records albums
Corinthian Records albums
Jonathan and Darlene Edwards albums
1950s comedy albums